Amir Hosseinpour is an opera director and choreographer who has worked in major opera houses around the world. He collaborated with directors such as Pierre Audi, founder of the Almeida Theatre, Nigel Lowery, and choreographer Jonathan Lunn. His production of Haydn's Orlando Paladino, co-directed with Nigel Lowery, continues to be broadcast on Sky Arts HD on a regular basis. Some of his biggest productions have been recorded for international DVD releases. His choreography for Michael Tippett's The Midsummer Marriage at the Bavarian State Opera in February 1998 was described as 'stunning' by The Daily Telegraph critic, Rupert Christiansen, and it was also highly praised by Wolfgang Sandner in the Frankfurter Allgemeine Zeitung. Other outstanding reviews for Hosseinpour's work in the German-language Frankfurter Allgemeine Zeitung (FAZ) were for Les Paladins (Rameau) at Basel in December 2004, reviewed by Gerhard Koch, Petrushka at Munich reviewed by Jochen Schmidt in December 1999 and Orphée et Eurydice at the Bavarian State Opera in November 2003.

In April 2013, Hosseinpour created the choreography for the world premiere of The Lost by Philip Glass at Linz, Austria. The title in the original German is Spuren der Verirrten, and the production was described as 'a visual feast' in both The Guardian and the New York Times. His choreography for William Tell at Welsh National Opera in 2014 was described as 'show stopping' in The Telegraph.

Hosseinpour was born in Iran, before the Iranian Revolution of 1979, and now lives in London. The opera houses he has worked in include Opera Garnier and Opera Bastille in Paris, Staatsoper Unter den Linden in Berlin, Bayerisches Staatsoper in Munich, La Scala in Milan, Denederlandse Opera in Amsterdam, Bregenz Festival, Opera North in Leeds, and London's Royal Opera House at Covent Garden.

Career
As director and/or choreographer
The Exterminating Angel, Thomas Ades, Royal Opera House London 2016–2017, (ROH / People)
La Traviata, Giuseppe Verdi, Landestheater Niederbayern, Passau, Germany (Landestheater Web, Biography)
Hôtel de Pékin, Willem Jeths, Dutch National Opera (:nl:Nederlandse Reisopera)
Italian Girl in Algiers, Rossini, Berlin State Opera
Akhnatan, Philip Glass, Vlaamse Opera, Antwerp, 2014–2015, (Programme)
William Tell, Rossini, Welsh National Opera, Autumn 2014
The Lost, Philip Glass, Linz, Austria, World Premiere 2013, (choreography)
Platée (direction and choreography) Dutch National Opera 
Les Troyens, (La Scala, Milan, 2010)
Castor et Pollux, (Dir. Pierre Audi) (De Nederlandse Opera Amsterdam)
The Twilight of the Gods, (De Nederlandse Opera, Amsterdam)
Hire, (De Nederlandse Opera in Amsterdam)
Alice in Wonderland, (De Nederlandse Opera, Amsterdam)
Alceste, (De Nederlandse Opera, Amsterdam)
Orlando Paladino, (Berlin State Opera)
Socrates (Innsbruck and Berlin State Opera)
Maria de Buenos Aires (Teatro Nacional de Sao Carlos National Theatre Lisbon)
The Florentine Intermedia (Saarbrücken Opera)
La Juive (Opera Bastille, Paris)
Tannhäuser (Festspielhaus Baden-Baden)
Zoroastre with Les Talens Lyriques, (2005) (Opéra Comique and Drottningholms Slottsteater), 
Julius Caesar (Bavarian State Opera), 
Dialogues des Carmelites (Opéra National du Rhin, Strasbourg)
Julius Caesar (Bavarian State Opera)
Midsummer Marriage (Bavarian State Opera)
The Flying Dutchman (Opera de Lille)
L'enfant et Les Sortileges (Opera Garnier, Paris)
Der Zwerg (Opera Garnier, Paris)
Orpheus & Euridice, co-directed with Nigel Lowery, (Bavarian State Opera)
Rinaldo, Co-directed with Nigel Lowery (Festwochen der Alten Musik)
Castor & Pollux, Dir. Pierre Audi (De Nederlandse Opera Amsterdam)
Tannhäuser, Festspielhaus Baden-Baden, with Jonathan Lunn
Les Troyens, with Jonathan Lunn (De Nederlandse Opera, Amsterdam)
The Barber of Seville, with Nigel Lowery, Royal Opera House, London

Choreography for TV
Classic Widows (South Bank Show, LWT) 
Trouble in Tahiti (BBC – Winner of the Vienna TV Award 2002)
La Poussière de l'Amour (Arte)
Barber Sivilia (Royal Opera House)
The Midsummer Marriage (Munich) 
L'Enfant et les Sortilèges (Paris National Opera)
The Flying Dutchman (Opéra de Lille)
Petrushka (Bavarian State Ballet, Munich)
The Golden Cockerel (Bregenz Festival)

Personal life

Amir Hosseinpour was born in Teheran, Iran, in 1966 to Abdolreza Hosseinpour and his wife Guity. His maternal grandfather was Fuad Rouhani founder and first general secretary of OPEC. His grandfather founded the Philarmonic Orchestra of Persia. It was under this grandfather's influence that Amir Hosseinpour pursued a career in opera and dance. Hosseinpour's aunt and uncle are Negui and Kamran Diba, the architect of the Tehran Museum of Contemporary Art and first cousin to Empress Farah Pahlavi, née Farah Diba. Amir Hosseinpour's paternal grandfather was Assadollah Hosseinpoor. After the 1979 Iranian revolution, the family fled to France and later Hosseinpour moved to London where he now lives.

References

Iran Chamber Society: Persian Dance and its forgotten history
Gluck d108045 [GF: Classical CD Reviews – June 2008 MusicWeb-International]
Masterpiece Basement

External links 

AMIR HOSSEINPOUR – IS THAT ALL THERE IS? Almeida-LONDON
EuroArts 2057788, Haydn: Orlando Paladino (Staatsoper unter den Linden, 2009)
Regie is in the eye of the beholder
klassik.com : Aktuelle CD-Besprechung, DVD-Kritik, CD-Besprechungen, DVD-Kritiken
Haydn, J. (Jacobs) – Orlando Paladino – Musik an sich
Flip-Flop's statt Kothurn: Telemann's "Der geduldige Sokrates" in der Staatsoper
Review of Les Troyen in Amsterdam
Triumph des Orchesters: Haydn's "Orlando Paladino" in der Staatsoper

Living people
Year of birth missing (living people)
Iranian opera directors
British opera directors
British choreographers
Iranian emigrants to the United Kingdom
Exiles of the Iranian Revolution in the United Kingdom